Micranthemum is a genus of flowering plants belonging to the family Linderniaceae.

Its native range is Eastern USA to Tropical and Subtropical America.

Species
Species:

Micranthemum arenarioides 
Micranthemum bryoides 
Micranthemum callitrichoides 
Micranthemum erosum 
Micranthemum glomeratum 
Micranthemum longipes 
Micranthemum micranthemoides 
Micranthemum procerorum 
Micranthemum reflexum 
Micranthemum rotundatum 
Micranthemum standleyi 
Micranthemum tetrandrum 
Micranthemum umbrosum

References

Linderniaceae
Lamiales genera